Liesbet Vindevoghel (born ) is a Belgian female former volleyball player, playing as an outside-spiker. She was part of the Belgium women's national volleyball team.

She competed at the 2009 Women's European Volleyball Championship. On club level she played for BV Nocera Umbra.

References

External links
bvbinfo.com
cev.lu
inv.fr
YouTube

1979 births
Living people
Belgian women's volleyball players
Place of birth missing (living people)
Wing spikers